Mauri Uolevi Röppänen (born 19 January 1946 in Outokumpu, North Karelia) is a Finnish biathlete and Olympic medalist. He received a silver medal at the 1972 Winter Olympics in Sapporo with the Finnish team.

References
 sports-reference.com

External links

1946 births
Living people
People from Outokumpu
Finnish male biathletes
Finnish male sport shooters
Olympic biathletes of Finland
Olympic shooters of Finland
Biathletes at the 1972 Winter Olympics
Shooters at the 1980 Summer Olympics
Shooters at the 1984 Summer Olympics
Olympic silver medalists for Finland
Olympic medalists in biathlon
Biathlon World Championships medalists
Medalists at the 1972 Winter Olympics
Sportspeople from North Karelia